Withlacoochee River may refer to:

 Withlacoochee River (Suwannee River),  Withlacoochee River (North), which originates in Georgia but ends in Florida
 Withlacoochee River (Florida), a.k.a. Withlacoochee River (South), which flows entirely through Florida